The Plato Palace is a residential skyscraper located in Taichung's 7th Redevelopment Zone, Xitun District, Taichung, Taiwan. Construction of the tower began in 2017 and it was topped out in 2020. As of January 2021, it is the tallest residential building in Taichung, 4th tallest building in Taichung and  20th tallest building in Taiwan. The building was constructed under strict requirements of preventing earthquakes and typhoons common in Taiwan.

See also 
 List of tallest buildings in Taiwan
 List of tallest buildings in Taichung
 Taichung's 7th Redevelopment Zone
 Savoy Palace (skyscraper)
 Fountain Palace

References

2021 establishments in Taiwan
Residential skyscrapers in Taiwan
Skyscrapers in Taichung
Taichung's 7th Redevelopment Zone
Apartment buildings in Taiwan
Residential buildings completed in 2021
Neoclassical architecture in Taiwan